The 2004 Pacific hurricane season had 17 tropical cyclones, of which 12 became named storms, 6 became hurricanes, and 3 became major hurricanes (Category 3 or higher). This timeline documents all the storm formations, strengthening, weakening, landfalls, extratropical transitions, as well as dissipation. It also includes information which was not operationally released, meaning that information from post-storm reviews by the National Hurricane Center, such as information on a storm that was not operationally warned on, have been included. The season officially began on May 15, 2004 in the eastern Pacific proper (June 1, 2004 in the central Pacific) and lasted until November 30 that same year. Areas east of 140°W are under the purview of the National Hurricane Center (NHC); the area between the International Date Line and 140°W, or the central Pacific, is under the purview of the Central Pacific Hurricane Center (CPHC).

The 2004 season got off to an early start with Tropical Storm Agatha, which formed a week after the season began. No tropical cyclones were active in June, the first such occurrence since 1969. July was more active, producing four tropical cyclones. Three of these (Blas, Celia, and Darby) became named storms, two (Celia and Darby) became hurricanes, and Hurricane Darby became the first major hurricane of the season. Additionally, a tropical depression in the central Pacific became the only tropical cyclone to form within the Central Pacific Hurricane Center's area of responsibility during the year. August was the most active month, producing six tropical cyclones, four named storms, and two hurricanes (Frank and Howard).  September saw a decline in activity, although all three storms that existed during the month were hurricanes, two of which (Howard and Javier) were major hurricanes. Hurricane Howard, which had formed in August, only became a major hurricane in September. Hurricane Javier – the final storm during the month – was the strongest storm of the season. October saw the final three tropical cyclones of the year; two developed into named storms (Kay and Lester). Neither of these storms became hurricanes.

Timeline of storms

May

May 15
The 2004 East Pacific hurricane season officially begins.

May 21
5:00 p.m.

May 22
5:00 a.m. PDT (12:00 UTC) – Tropical Depression One-E strengthens into a tropical storm and is named Agatha.
5:00 p.m. PDT (00:00 UTC May 22) – Tropical Storm Agatha reaches its peak intensity of 60 mph (95 km/h).

May 23
5:00 p.m. PDT (00:00 UTC May 22) – Tropical Storm Agatha weakens into a tropical depression.

May 24
5:00 a.m. PDT (12:00 UTC) – Tropical Depression Agatha degenerates into an area of low pressure.

June
June 1
The 2004 Central Pacific hurricane season officially begins.

July
July 2
5:00 a.m.
5:00 p.m.

July 3
5:00 p.m. PDT (00:00 UTC July 4) – Tropical Depression Two-E degenerates into an area of low pressure.

July 4
2:00 p.m.
2:00 p.m.

July 5
2:00 p.m. HST (00:00 UTC July 6) – Tropical Depression One-C dissipates.

July 12
5:00 a.m.
11:00 a.m. PDT (18:00 UTC) – Tropical Depression Three-E strengthens into a tropical storm and is named Blas.

July 13
5:00 a.m.

July 14
11:00 a.m. PDT (18:00 UTC) – Tropical Storm Blas weakens into a tropical depression.
11:00 p.m. PDT (06:00 UTC July 15) – Tropical Depression Blas degenerates into an area of low pressure.

July 18
5:00 p.m.

July 19
5:00 a.m. PDT (12:00 UTC) – Tropical Depression Four-E strengthens into a tropical storm and is named Celia.

July 21
5:00 p.m. PDT (00:00 UTC July 22) – Tropical Storm Celia strengthens into the first hurricane of the season.
11:00 p.m.

July 22
11:00 a.m. PDT (18:00 UTC) – Hurricane Celia weakens into a tropical storm.

July 24
11:00 a.m. PDT (18:00 UTC) – Tropical Storm Celia weakens into a tropical depression.

July 25
5:00 p.m. PDT (00:00 UTC July 22) – Tropical Depression Celia degenerates into an area of low pressure.

July 26
5:00 a.m.
5:00 p.m. PDT (00:00 UTC July 27) – Tropical Depression Five-E is upgraded to Tropical Storm Darby.

July 27
5:00 p.m. PDT (00:00 UTC July 28) – Tropical Storm Darby strengthens into a Category 1 hurricane.

July 28
11:00 a.m. PDT (18:00 UTC) – Hurricane Darby reaches Category 2 intensity.
11:00 p.m. PDT (06:00 UTC July 29) – Hurricane Darby reaches Category 3 intensity and becomes the first Pacific major hurricane since Hurricane Kenna in 2002.
11:00 p.m.

July 29
11:00 a.m. PDT (18:00 UTC) – Hurricane Darby weakens to Category 2 intensity.
5:00 p.m. PDT (00:00 UTC July 28) – Hurricane Darby weakens to Category 1 intensity.

July 30
5:00 a.m. PDT (12:00 UTC) – Hurricane Darby weakens into a tropical storm.

July 31
5:00 a.m. PDT (12:00 UTC) – Tropical Storm Darby weakens into a tropical depression.
5:00 p.m. PDT (2:00 p.m. HST 00:00 UTC August 1) – The NHC passes the primary warning responsibility of Tropical Depression Darby to the CPHC as Darby crosses 140°W.
11:00 p.m. PDT (06:00 UTC August 1) – Tropical Depression Six-E forms.
11:00 p.m.

August
August 1
2:00 a.m. HST (12:00 UTC) – Tropical Depression Darby dissipates.
11:00 p.m. PDT (06:00 UTC August 2) – Tropical Depression Six-E dissipates.

August 18

11:00 p.m.

August 19
11:00 p.m. PDT (06:00 UTC August 20) – Tropical Depression Seven-E intensifies into a tropical storm and is named Estelle.

August 20
11:00 p.m. PDT (8:00 p.m. HST; 06:00 UTC August 21) – The NHC passes primary warning responsibility of Tropical Storm Estelle to the CPHC as Estelle crosses 140°W.

August 21
2:00 a.m. HST (12:00 UTC) – Tropical Storm Estelle reaches its peak intensity of 70 mph (110 km/h).
August 22
2:00 p.m. HST (00:00 UTC August 23) – Tropical Storm Estelle weakens into a tropical depression.
11:00 p.m. PDT (06:00 UTC August 23) – Tropical Depression Eight-E forms from the remains of Tropical Storm Earl, which crossed over from the Atlantic basin.
August 23
5:00 a.m. PDT (12:00 UTC) – Tropical Depression Eight-E becomes a tropical storm and is named Frank.
11:00 a.m. PDT (18:00 UTC) – Tropical Storm Frank strengthens into a Category 1 hurricane.
11:00 a.m.
5:00 p.m. PDT (00:00 UTC August 24) – Tropical Depression Nine-E reaches its peak intensity of 35 mph (55 km/h).
11:00 p.m.
August 24
8:00 a.m. HST (18:00 UTC) – Tropical Depression Estelle degenerates into a remnant low.
11:00 p.m. PDT (06:00 UTC August 25) – Hurricane Frank weakens into a tropical storm.
August 25
5:00 p.m. PDT (00:00 UTC August 26) – Tropical Storm Frank weakens into a tropical depression.
11:00 p.m. PDT (06:00 UTC August 26) – Tropical Depression Frank degenerates into a remnant low.
August 26
5:00 a.m.
11:00 a.m. PDT (18:00 UTC) – Tropical Depression Nine-E degenerates into a remnant low.
11:00 a.m. PDT (18:00 UTC) – Tropical Depression Ten-E strengthens into a tropical storm and is named Georgette.

August 27
5:00 a.m. PDT (12:00 UTC) – Tropical Storm Georgette reaches its peak intensity of 65 mph (100 km/h).

August 29
11:00 p.m. PDT (06:00 UTC August 30) – Tropical Storm Georgette weakens into a tropical depression.

August 30

5:00 a.m.
11:00 a.m. PDT (18:00 UTC) – Tropical Depression Georgette degenerates into a remnant low.
5:00 p.m. PDT (00:00 UTC August 31) – Tropical Depression Eleven-E intensifies into a tropical storm and is named Howard.

August 31
11:00 p.m. PDT (06:00 UTC September 1) – Tropical Storm Howard strengthens into a Category 1 hurricane.

September
September 1
11:00 p.m. PDT (06:00 UTC September 2) – Hurricane Howard rapidly intensifies and reaches Category 3 intensity.
September 2
5:00 a.m. PDT (12:00 UTC) – Hurricane Howard reaches Category 4 intensity. At the same time, it reaches its peak intensity of 140 mph (230 km/h).
11:00 p.m. PDT (06:00 UTC September 3) – Hurricane Howard weakens into Category 3 intensity.
September 3
5:00 a.m. PDT (12:00 UTC) – Hurricane Howard weakens to Category 2 intensity.
11:00 a.m. PDT (18:00 UTC) – Hurricane Howard weakens to Category 1 intensity.
September 4
5:00 a.m. PDT (12:00 UTC) – Hurricane Howard weakens into a tropical storm.
11:00 p.m. PDT (06:00 UTC September 5) – Tropical Storm Howard weakens into a tropical depression.
September 5
11:00 a.m. PDT (18:00 UTC) – Tropical Depression Howard degenerates into a remnant low.
September 7

11:00 p.m.
September 8
11:00 a.m. PDT (18:00 UTC) – Tropical Depression Twelve-E becomes a tropical storm and is named Isis.
September 10
5:00 a.m. PDT (12:00 UTC) – Tropical Storm Isis weakens into a tropical depression.
11:00 a.m.
September 11
5:00 a.m. PDT (12:00 UTC) – Tropical Depression Thirteen-E becomes a tropical storm and is named Javier.
5:00 p.m. PDT (00:00 UTC September 12) – Tropical Depression Isis restrengthens into a tropical storm.
September 12
11:00 a.m. PDT (18:00 UTC) – Tropical Storm Javier strengthens into a Category 1 hurricane.
11:00 p.m. PDT (06:00 UTC September 13) – Hurricane Javier reaches Category 2 intensity.
September 13

5:00 a.m. PDT (12:00 UTC) – Hurricane Javier reaches Category 3 intensity.
11:00 a.m. PDT (18:00 UTC) – Hurricane Javier reaches Category 4 intensity.
5:00 p.m. PDT (00:00 UTC September 14) – Hurricane Javier reaches its peak intensity of 150 mph (240 km/h), making it the strongest storm of the season.
September 15
5:00 a.m. PDT (12:00 UTC) – Tropical Storm Isis strengthens into a Category 1 hurricane.
11:00 a.m. PDT (18:00 UTC) – Hurricane Isis weakens back into a tropical storm as the eye collapses.
5:00 p.m. PDT (00:00 UTC September 16) – Hurricane Javier weakens to Category 3 intensity.
September 16
5:00 a.m. PDT (12:00 UTC) – Tropical Storm Isis weakens into a tropical depression.
11:00 a.m. PDT (18:00 UTC) – Tropical Depression Isis degenerates into a remnant low.
September 17
5:00 a.m. PDT (12:00 UTC) – Hurricane Javier weakens to Category 2 intensity.
5:00 p.m. PDT (00:00 UTC September 18) – Hurricane Javier weakens to Category 1 intensity.
September 18
5:00 a.m. PDT (12:00 UTC) – Hurricane Javier weakens into a tropical storm.
5:00 p.m. PDT (00:00 UTC September 19) – Tropical Storm Javier weakens into a tropical depression.
September 19
4:00 a.m. PDT (11:00 UTC) – Tropical Depression Javier makes landfall on the west coast of Baja California.
11:00 a.m. PDT (18:00 UTC) – Tropical Depression Javier degenerates into a remnant low.

October
October 4
11:00 a.m.
11:00 p.m. PDT (06:00 UTC October 5) – Tropical Depression Fourteen-E strengthens into a tropical storm and is named Kay.

October 5
5:00 a.m.
11:00 a.m. PDT (18:00 UTC) – Tropical Storm Kay weakens into a tropical depression.

October 6
5:00 a.m. PDT (12:00 UTC) – Tropical Depression Kay weakens into a remnant low.

October 11

11:00 a.m.

October 12
11:00 a.m. PDT (18:00 UTC) – Tropical Depression Fifteen-E strengthens into a tropical storm and is named Lester.
5:00 p.m.

October 13
5:00 a.m. PDT (12:00 UTC) – Tropical Storm Lester weakens into a tropical depression.
11:00 a.m. PDT (18:00 UTC) – Tropical Depression Lester dissipates.

October 24
5:00 p.m.
11:00 p.m.

October 26
3:00 a.m. PDT (10:00 UTC) – Tropical Depression Sixteen-E makes landfall on Sinaloa state in Mexico.
11:00 a.m. PDT (18:00 UTC) – Tropical Depression Sixteen-E dissipates over land.

November
November 30
The 2004 Pacific hurricane season officially ends.

See also

Timeline of the 2004 Atlantic hurricane season
Timeline of the 2004 Pacific typhoon season

Timelines of the South Pacific cyclone seasons: 2003–04, 2004–05

Notes

References

External links
National Hurricane Center
Central Pacific Hurricane Center 

Pacific hurricane meteorological timelines
Articles which contain graphical timelines